Nicklas Højlund (born 6 March 1990) is a Danish footballer who last played for Lyngby BK.

References

External links
 Nicklas Højlund profile at Lyngby BK Official website

Danish men's footballers
Denmark under-21 international footballers
Danish Superliga players
Lyngby Boldklub players
1990 births
Living people
Footballers from Copenhagen
Association football goalkeepers